Givat Massuah is a new neighborhood in the southwest outskirts of Jerusalem, overlooking Malha and Emek Lavan Valley. It has a population of 1,100 families, mainly secular and Orthodox Jews. Givat Massuah was established in 1996.

Givat Massuah is built in a modern style and has many parks, trees and playgrounds. Services offered in Givat Massuah include a grocery store, barber shop, bakery, two medical centers, several kindergartens, elementary school, three Orthodox synagogues, a Bnei Akiva and Scouting branch.

References

Neighbourhoods of Jerusalem